Abraham Goos (1590 – ca. 1643?) was a Dutch cartographer, publisher, and engraver. He made globes, maps of North America, a comprehensive map of European coastlines, and the first printed Hebrew language map of The Holy Land.

Biography
Abraham Goos was the son of Pieter Goos, a diamond cutter, and Margriete van den Keere. He married Stijntgen Theunisdr de Ram ("Stijntje Teunis") in 1614, in Haarlem. He lived on the Nieuwendijk in Amsterdam, and by 1615 had moved to the Kalverstraat, in "'t Vergulde Caertboeck". His first teacher was Jodocus Hondius (1563–1612) (his cousin by marriage), according to a 1616 note by Goos. After Hondius died, his son-in-law Jan Janssonius took over Hondius's business and continued the partnership with Goos. One of Hondius' specialties was the manufacture of globes, and Goos and Janssonius continued this, regularly modifying them as more geographical information became available. With his cousin Pieter van den Keere (in Latin, Petrus Kaerius; Goos's mother was van den Keere's sister), Goos engraved the globe of Petrus Plancius, in 1614. Goos becomes a specialist in engraving and is known for his accuracy. In 1616 he published Nieuw Nederlandtsch Caertboeck, an atlas of the Seventeen Provinces in 23 maps, and one of the first atlases of the Netherlands; Goos took care of the maps. He is paid 120 guilders by the States General of the Netherlands. It is republished in 1625.

Janssonius and Goos collaborated until the latter's death. In 1619 Janssonius printed Goos's Novus tabularum geographicarum Belgicae liber, in Amsterdam, and Goos engraved seven maps for Janssonius's atlas of Germany. In 1620 Goos engraved a map of Europe's coasts, with a separate map with parts of Greenland, Spitsbergen, and Nova Zembla (the maps were drawn by Harmen and Marten Jansz). A year later Janssonius produced a globe made by Goos, and the same year he published a Goos-made map of the Seventeen Provinces, Belgium Sive Inferior Germania post omnes in hac forma, exactissime descripta, based on a 1608 map by Willem Blaeu. The map is unique because the Liège diocese is left out, on purpose, since it was not part of the Seventeen Provinces. It also indicates the draining of lakes that would form three polders: the Beemster, the Purmer, and the Zijpe- en Hazepolder; in a later edition published by Janssonius some of these lakes have been filled in with parcels.

With Jacob ben Abraham Zaddiq, he printed what is called the first map of the Holy Land in Hebrew, in 1620/21. It was thought that a Jewish engraver in Amsterdam named Abraham B. Jacob was the first one to do so, in 1695. The map is cited as an example of "Jewish authors creat[ing] artistic maps as part of their encounter with Christian society". (An earlier, much more schematic map not drawn to scale is a woodcut from Mantua, from the 1560s, with Hebrew designations.)

Another first is his 1624 map of North America, published in Amsterdam; it is "the first major map to depict California as a distinct island" (though it does not mention "California"). It is the first to name the Hudson river, among other landmarks. Whether it really predates the map by Henry Briggs, published in 1625 in London, is a matter of some contention; it has been argued (based on a note from 1622, which said California was an island) that Briggs had sent a draft of a map to his Amsterdam publisher, which in turn influenced Goos. Maps of his are published in various editions of the Atlas minor version of Gerard Mercator's 1595 (folio) atlas, starting in 1628 (Jodocus Hondius had acquired the copper plates from Mercator's son in 1604).

His death date is unknown, though it was likely before 1643. He had at least two sons, Pieter Goos (1616–1675) and Abraham Goos (baptized 1621), and a daughter, Cathalyna (baptized 1623). Pieter was also an engraver; in 1643 he married Susanna de Reyger and, widowed, he married Geertruyt van Ruyff in 1649. Like his father, he engraved maps, including a map of Spitsbergen (published in 1650 by Cornelis de Leeuw), and another in 1662, in an atlas called De Zee-Atlas ofte Water-weereld.

Maps by Abraham Goos

References

External links
Nieuw Nederlandtsch Caertboeck

17th-century Dutch cartographers
1590 births
1643 deaths